"My Baby" is a song by American rapper and singer Lil Skies featuring fellow American singer Zhavia Ward. Written alongside producer CashMoneyAP, it was released on April 29, 2021, as the lead single (fifth overall) from the deluxe of Skies' second studio album Unbothered (2021),

Composition 
In the song, Lil Skies and Zhavia Ward sings about their feelings towards their respective romantic interests.

Reception
Samantha Agate of TalentRecap praised the song but wrote she would have liked it to have been longer.

References 

2021 singles
2021 songs
Atlantic Records singles
Lil Skies songs
Zhavia Ward songs
Songs written by CashMoneyAP
Songs written by Lil Skies
Alternative R&B songs